The 2009–10 Season is Preston North End's 6th season in the Championship. It is their 10th successive season in the second division of the English football league system.

Players

First-team squad
Squad at end of season

Left club during season

League table

Match results

Legend

Pre-season friendlies

Championship

FA Cup

League Cup

Transfers

In

Out

Loaned out

Player statistics

Last Update: 30 August 2009
Data includes all competitions
Substitution appearances included as full
FLC – Football League Championship
FA – FA Cup
CC – Carling Cup
Ast – Assists

Top scorer

Championship results by round

Notes

References

Preston North End
Preston North End F.C. seasons